Imad Benchlef (born 12 October 1993) is an Algerian footballer who plays for USM Alger in the Algerian Ligue Professionnelle 1.

Career
In 2018, Oussama Benbot signed a contract with NA Hussein Dey.

In 2022, Benchlef signed a contract with USM Alger.

References

External links
 

Living people
1993 births
Algerian footballers
USM Alger players
JS El Biar players
NA Hussein Dey players